Predrag Ristović (born 21 September 1975) is a Serbian former professional footballer who played as a goalkeeper.

Club career
Ristović is best remembered for his stints at Zemun and Royal Antwerp, spending four seasons with each side.

International career
Ristović was capped once by FR Yugoslavia in July 2001, appearing as a late second-half substitute for Saša Stevanović in a 0–1 loss to Japan at the Kirin Cup.

External links
 
 
 
 

Association football goalkeepers
Challenger Pro League players
Expatriate footballers in Belgium
Expatriate footballers in Russia
First League of Serbia and Montenegro players
FK Loznica players
FK Obilić players
FK Rad players
FK Zemun players
Royal Cappellen F.C. players
RFC Liège players
Royal Antwerp F.C. players
Serbia and Montenegro expatriate footballers
Serbia and Montenegro expatriate sportspeople in Belgium
Serbia and Montenegro expatriate sportspeople in Russia
Serbia and Montenegro footballers
Serbia and Montenegro international footballers
Serbian expatriate footballers
Serbian expatriate sportspeople in Belgium
Serbian footballers
Sportspeople from Loznica
1975 births
Living people
FC Spartak Moscow players